The 1952 All-Ireland Senior Football Championship Final was the 65th All-Ireland Final and the deciding match of the 1952 All-Ireland Senior Football Championship, an inter-county Gaelic football tournament for the top teams in Ireland.

Mick Higgins was Cavan's captain on the day.

Match 1

Summary
Cavan equalised with a strange point — Edwin Carolan chased a ball that seemed to go wide, and kicked it across the goalmouth and over the bar. Carolan's equaliser has been described as a "wonder score".

Details

Match 2

Summary
Mick Higgins's five points won the replay for Cavan, while Peter McDermott (Meath) missed an easy goal chance.

Details

Post-match
Cavan have not appeared in an All-Ireland football final since.

References

All-Ireland Senior Football Championship Final
All-Ireland Senior Football Championship Final, 1952
All-Ireland Senior Football Championship Finals
All-Ireland Senior Football Championship Finals
Cavan county football team matches
Meath county football team matches